The Renault 18 is a large family car produced by French manufacturer Renault between 1978 and 1989, with South American production continuing until 1994. It formed the basis for the closely related Renault Fuego Coupé, with which it shared its floorpan and drivetrain, but with the Fuego initially using the negative offset type front suspension from the larger Renault 20/30, which became standardized across the 18 range from the 1983 model year onwards.

Development
The Renault 18 was intended as a replacement for the Renault 12, which, having been in production since 1969, was beginning to show its age by the late 1970s, though the 12 was kept in production alongside the 18 until 1980. Unlike the earlier car, the 18 was designed quickly; the time between its initial conception and its actual launch date was only eighteen months, primarily due to the fact that the 18 was based upon the 12's underpinnings. Production peaked early: 1979 was the R18's biggest year, after which sales began a gradual decline. Originally, the 1.4 was the most popular model, but this soon changed to the 1.6. By 1986 the largest, 2-liter engine represented the biggest portion of the production.

Although Renault made numerous forays into international markets in countries such as Argentina with the 12, their first true "world car" was their 18, hence the slogan Meeting International Requirements, which (as well as in France) would later be produced in ten other countries and four continents around the world. In 1981, the Renault 18 was selected by India's massive public sector car manufacturing project Maruti Udyog to be built there at a rate of 100,000 cars per year - including a pickup truck version meant to compete with small Japanese trucks. However, after closer review and at the direction of Rajiv Gandhi (who had always wanted to build a small people's car) it was determined that the economics did not make sense and that a smaller, cheaper car would be the better option. Maruti instead linked up with Japanese Suzuki to build the subcompact Alto under license.

Renault Eve

The Renault 18 also formed the basis for the "Renault Eve" research car. This experimental fuel efficient concept car, powered by a 1.1 L engine from the R5, featured then state-of-the-art microcomputer microprocessor, an array of specialised sensors, an electronically controlled carburettor, continuously variable automatic transmission, as well as aerodynamics and use of lightweight materials. The resulting body shape resulted in a very low 0.239  drag coefficient. The project was sponsored by the French government.

Initial range
The Renault 18 went into production at Renault's Flins factory in France in December 1977. It was presented at the Geneva Salon in March 1978, with marketing and sales starting the following month.

Initially, the R18 was only available as a four-door saloon, in TL, GTL, TS and GTS trim variations. The TL and GTL were powered by the 1397 cc Renault Cléon petrol engine (which was developed from the 1289 cc engine from the Renault 12), which produced . Both models had a four-speed gearbox. The TS had a four-speed manual gearbox, while the GTS had a 5-speed manual gearbox, with optional 3-speed electronic automatic transmission available for both models. The automatic versions of the TS and GTS models were called the TS Automatic and GTS Automatic to distinguish them from their manual transmission counterparts. Beginning in 1978, the Renault 18 was also assembled in Romania under the name Dacia 18. Fewer than 100 cars were built by Dacia, mainly for the government. It had been intended as a replacement for the Dacia 1300, a model derived from and based on the Renault 12, but the license and production between Dacia and Renault ended in 1979 and the model was dropped.

The 18 was Renault's first car to use the 1.4 L Cléon engine in the medium-size car sector. The Renault 18 also used three-stud wheels (similar to those of the Citroën 2CV), rather than the four- or five-stud wheels common on most of its contemporaries. In 1980 Turbo and Diesel R18 models came fitted with four-stud wheels (necessitated by using suspension parts and wheels from the larger R20 and Fuego), with all versions using four-stud wheels from the 1983 facelift onwards.

Timeline
Deliveries began early in April 1978 and sales in the United Kingdom began just before Christmas. On the British market, it was designed to compete with the market-leading Ford Cortina, Morris Marina, Vauxhall Cavalier and Chrysler Alpine – with all of these cars except the Alpine featuring rear-wheel drive. It was initially hugely successful on the UK market, peaking in 1980 as the tenth best-selling car there with over 30,000 sales, but sales declined over the next few years in the face of new British-built competitors in the shape of the Ford Sierra, Vauxhall Cavalier, and Austin Montego.

The first changes were announced for 1979 at the Paris Motor Show in October 1978. Rear-seat belts were now fitted as standard, and a manual choke replaced the automatic one with which the car had been launched. The station wagon as well as a new basic model, called simply the "Renault 18", were introduced. Also new for 1979, the 18 Automatic became a separate model (with GTL trim) rather than simply a transmission option. A year later, all production models were outfitted with a new alternator that included a built-in electronic regulator. In July 1980, the 18 Diesel model was added. This model was mechanically similar to the Renault 20 Diesel, and was equipped with a  engine (rated at ), negative offset front suspension, and larger four-stud wheels. The diesel-engined 18s came in two trim levels: TD and GTD. The basic TD (which was available as both a saloon and estate) had a four-speed gearbox and the equipment level of the TS, while the GTD (which was exclusively available as a saloon) had a five-speed gearbox and an equivalent equipment level as the GTS. Power-assisted steering was optional on the GTD, while a five-speed gearbox was optional on the TD. Diesel model sales never reached thirty percent of the overall annual production.

The 18 Turbo model was introduced in September 1980, borrowing from other Renault models. A little later yet, a Turbodiesel version arrived; it had an  version of the 2.1 L inline-four fitted to the TD/GTD and at the time it was the fastest car in its class. However, it soon had to compete with newer and quicker performance versions of the Vauxhall Cavalier (Opel Ascona) and Ford Sierra.

Model year 1982 saw the introduction of several changes to the entire lineup of 18 models, shown in late 1981: the negative offset front suspension, previously available only on the Turbo and Diesel models, was made standard. The front indicator lenses were changed from orange to clear, bumpers and door handles were switched from chrome to black polyester, and the seats were restyled to provide more space in the rear seats. Model-specific changes included the available option of a five-speed gearbox on the TL; the GTL received an "economy-tune"  version of the  engine, as well as a five-speed gearbox, higher final drive ratio, electronic ignition and an "economizer" gauge. The TS and GTS version were discontinued. A two-litre model entered production, for export only until late 1983.

A special edition, the R18 "American" arrived in 1983. Limited to 5,200 examples (1,500 in the UK), it had a special black over silver two-tone paint and numerous luxury equipment such as alloy road wheels and a plusher interior. It included the 1.6 L engine and sold well. An "American 2" version was introduced in 1984. Included were central locking, radio, and a choice of four colour schemes, with a total of 14,000 units (8,000 for France and 6,000 for the rest of Europe).

The "Type 2" was introduced in April 1984. The grille was changed and all models gained a front air dam, while the saloons also received a standard rear spoiler. The three-stud wheel rims were replaced with the larger four-stud wheel rims (with the Base, TL, and TD just having center caps, and the GTL, Automatic, GTS, and GTD all having full wheel trims). The biggest difference was that the dashboard was replaced by that of the Fuego. The 2 L GTX model was introduced in France in the fall of 1983. Subsequent years saw fewer changes to the 18 line, in preparation for the launch of the Renault 21 early in 1986. For 1986, a limited range was sold as the "18 Gala" in France, with the Turbo model discontinued during 1985 (only about 650 Turbos were built that year). July 1986 marked the end for the R18 in France. Production continued in Latin America until 1994, however, and the R18 also continued to be manufactured in France with the 2 L petrol engine until 1989 for export only.

Estate model

By the late 1970s, European production of the Renault 12 was being gradually wound down, followed by the arrival of the estate versions of the Renault 18 on 1 March 1979.

They were otherwise mechanically identical to their saloon counterparts. The estates were identical to the saloons in equipment, except that the TS estate additionally featured shock-absorbent bumpers, door mouldings, and front seat head restraints from the 18 GTL saloon. The estate proved almost as popular as the saloon.

In Germany the Break was originally marketed as the "Variable", after the Type 2 facelift it became the "Combi". In the Netherlands, it was called the "Stationcar", while it was sold as the "Familiar" in Spain. In the United States, it was marketed as the "Sportswagon", later becoming the "Sportwagon" without the "s".

U.S. market

American Motors Corporation (AMC) had established several assembly and marketing agreements with Renault since the 1960s. A financial partnership in 1979 evolved into the French firm's holding a controlling (46 percent) stake in the smallest U.S. automaker. One aspect of AMC's strategy included marketing a larger-sized front-wheel-drive automobile.

The Renault 18 was re-engineered for the U.S. and Canadian markets. Modifications for the U.S. market included more stringent emissions controls, larger bumpers designed to withstand  impacts, two-tone paint, and uncovered sealed-beam headlights, as well as different hubcaps and interior trim. The US and Canadian version of the 18 was the first Renault about which critics claimed the Frenchness had been taken out.

Being fuel injected, the four-door and the station wagon (called "Sportswagon"; the middle "s" was later dropped) were sold by AMC dealers as the Renault 18i beginning with the 1981 model year. The sedan was discontinued during 1983 and the remaining station wagon body style was renamed simply the Sportwagon from 1984, remaining on sale until 1986. The majority of sales during 1986 were leftover 1985 models.

The 18i was sold in base or deluxe trims, with the well appointed deluxe receiving a different "high line" dash and a leather upholstered "touring" interior. A four- or a five-speed manual was available, or a three-speed automatic. When introduced, the fuel injected (Bosch L-Jetronic), 1647 cc straight-four offered  at 5500 rpm in federalized trim. Renault had planned on bringing in the 2.1-liter diesel engine for the 18i, but after the implosion of the United States diesel market in the early 1980s this was cancelled.

For 1983, the 18i received various upgrades while the base trim was dropped, leaving only the well equipped deluxe version. The three-wand setup was replaced by a more traditional two-stalk solution for operating lights, wipers, and indicators. Either a five-speed manual or three-speed automatic were on offer; the four-speed was no longer available after 1982. Period reviewers also commented on an improved quality feel vis-à-vis earlier model years. Nonetheless, the 1983 was the last year for the sedan and sales of the Sportwagon dropped steadily until 1986. Along with the name change, the 1.6 was replaced by the larger 2.2-liter engine also known from the Fuego for the Sportwagon. These feature prominent "2.2 litres" badging on the rear hatch and were available in Deluxe or Touring trim. The Deluxe has aerodynamic hubcaps while the sporty Touring has alloy wheels and the 18 Turbo's contrasting graphics along tha flanks.

For the 1987 model year, the Sportwagon was replaced by the Renault 21's US and Canadian equivalent, the Eagle Medallion.

Assembly in Australia
Starting in 1980, the top-of-the-line Renault 18 GTS saloons and estates with right-hand drive were assembled in Heidelberg, Australia by Renault Australia from CKD (Completely Knocked Down) kits imported from France.

South American markets

In Argentina, Colombia, and Venezuela, there were versions that included the TX and GTX. The TX was the initial 1982 model, featuring the Douvrin 2.0 L four-cylinder powerplant, a first for a production 18 worldwide (there was a need for a powerful car to replace the Renault Torino luxury-sports range). There was also the GTX-II, featuring a basic onboard computer that displayed fuel consumption, etc. It was available with 1.6 L (TL), 2.0 L, and 2.1 L diesel engines. For 1993 only, a  2.2 L engine was installed in the GTX-II.

The Renault 18 was assembled in Colombia until 1994. In Uruguay, production began in 1982 and lasted until 1994. The Uruguayan cars had Argentinian bodies and engines imported from France.

The Renault 18 GTX was also rallied in South America by Renault of Argentina, following the various competition successes of the earlier 12 TS.

Trim levels

Legacy
A total of 2,028,964 Renault 18s were built in France alone. The R18 was replaced by the Renault 21 saloon and Nevada/Savana estate starting in 1986. The U.S. market successor for 1987 was the Eagle Medallion. The Renault 18 was withdrawn from the remaining European markets by 1989. It remained in production in South America into the mid-1990s. The last Argentinian Renault 18 rolled off the production line in 1993, after a total of 132,956 units were built in Argentina alone.

It was launched on the British market in December 1978 but was discontinued there in July 1986. Sales were initially strong, peaking at over 30,000 in 1980 when it was the tenth best-selling car in the UK and the most popular foreign model; but declined over the next few years as new competitors arrived from Ford, Vauxhall, and British Leyland.

References

External links

 
 A personal Renault 18 site accessed on 26 July 2022.
 Renault 14 & 18 - English version 27 March 2002, accessed on 26 July 2022.

18
Mid-size cars
Sedans
Station wagons
Front-wheel-drive vehicles
1980s cars
Cars introduced in 1978
1990s cars
Cars of Argentina